Instrument myopia, is a form of myopia that occurs when someone is looking into an optical instrument such as a microscope. The person focusses their eyes closer than needed for the image produced by the instrument.

Characteristics
Ordinarily, when someone looks at an object at, say, one meter from the eyes, the eyes make reflex adjustments so the object appears single and clear. That is, the eyes converge on the object, to bring its image in each eye onto the central part of each retina, the fovea. This ensures that the person sees one object instead of two, and is referred to as singleness of vision or binocular fusion. The focussing of each eye, its accommodation, is adjusted so the retinal image of the object is as sharp as possible. This is done via contraction of the ciliary muscles controlling the shape of the crystalline lens of the eye. Although convergence and accommodation are separate processes, they normally operate synergistically.

When someone looks into an optical instrument, such as a microscope, vision is far from ordinary. A microscope might force the person to use only one eye, it presents the person with a limited field of view, it presents a magnified view, and it allows the person to adjust the focus of the instrument for any viewing distance. Ideally, the person will choose a focus adjustment on the instrument that allows the eyes to have relaxed accommodation—that is to present the objects at a distance of about 6 meters, or optical infinity. However, most people tend to accommodate to nearer than 6 m. It is this too-close focussing of the eyes that is instrument myopia.

Accommodating to a distance nearer than 6 meters makes the ciliary muscles work harder than they need to, leading to fatigue. Some binocular microscopes are designed so that the vergence of the eyes is correct for a 6-meter viewing distance. Accommodating to a closer distance will tend to converge the eyes, leading to double vision.

According to Wesner and Miller (1986), instrument myopia is promoted when the viewing is with one eye, when the field of view is small, and when the luminance is low, concluding that these are consistent with accommodation's going towards a person's dark focus, which is about one meter from the eyes.
Wesner and Miller also said it is possible that a person's knowledge that the viewed object is very close (on the microscope stage) contributes to instrument myopia. They said that instrument myopia is minimised by using a binocular microscope that forces the person's vergence angle to be small.

History
It is unknown by whom instrument myopia was first reported.

References

External links
Articles by three ophthalmologists: http://www.eyeworld.org/article-instrument-and-microscope-myopia--what-s-all-the-focus-about

Eye
Vision
Disorders of ocular muscles, binocular movement, accommodation and refraction